The companion of the president of the Italian Republic (sometimes simply known as Donna) is the first lady or gentleman of Italy and often plays a protocol role at the Quirinal Palace and during official visits.

If the President of the Republic is single or widowed, the functions of the companion may be performed by another person as substitute companion. Since 2015, Laura Mattarella has held the unofficial position of first lady alongside her father, President Sergio Mattarella.

List

Spouses of the presidents

Daughters of the presidents

See also 
First Lady
List of presidents of Italy

 
Lists of Italian women
Italy
Lists of wives